The 2010–11 FAW Welsh Cup was the 124th season of the annual knockout tournament for competitive football teams in Wales, excluding those who play in the English League System. The 2010–11 tournament commenced on 14 August 2010, and ran until the final in May 2011.  The winner of the Cup will qualify to the second qualifying round of the 2011–12 UEFA Europa League.

Calendar

Qualifying round one
The draw for both qualifying rounds one and two was held on 9 July 2010. Qualifying round one games were played on 14 August 2010.

North

|}

South

|}

Qualifying round two
Qualifying round two games were played on 28 August 2010.  The round included the thirty winners from qualifying round one, plus sixty-six new teams that entered at this level.

North

|}

South

|}

First round
The draw for the first round was held on 31 August 2010. Games were held on 11 September 2010.  Thirty-two new entrants joined the forty-eight winners from qualifying round two.

North

|}

1Match was played in Llandudno, although Dolgellau was officially the home team.

South

|}

1Match was postponed until 18 September.

Second round
The draw for the second round was held on 14 September 2010. Games were played on 2 October 2010.

North

|}

South

|}

Third round
The draw for the third round was held on 4 October 2010. The twelve teams competing in the 2010–11 Welsh Premier League entered the competition at this stage. Starting with this round, teams are no longer divided into north and south divisions.  Games will be played on 6 November 2010, with the exception of the Airbus UK Broughton/The New Saints match, which took place on 5 November 2010, and the postponed Llanelli/Aberystwyth Town match, which took place on 13 November 2010.

|}

Fourth round
The draw for the fourth round was held on 13 November 2010. Entering this round were the 16 winners from the previous round. The matches are scheduled to take place on 29 January 2011.

|}

Quarterfinals to Final

References

External links
 Official site

2010-11
1